Hubbard Park, located in the Hanging Hills of Connecticut, is a wooded, mountainous park located just outside the city center of Meriden, Connecticut. The park is listed on the National Register of Historic Places.

History 
Most of the land was given to the town by Walter Hubbard, president of the Bradley & Hubbard Manufacturing Company.  In his donation, the land was given outright, with the stipulation that everything connected with the park was to remain free of charge for the people of Meriden, and that no concessions for profit were ever allowed within the park area.

Hubbard spent a great deal of time and energy creating the park.  He personally spent between $400,000 and $500,000 to clear land, build roads, and construct Mirror Lake with the help of Frederick Law Olmsted, who is best known for designing New York City's Central Park.  Hubbard built a tower on East Peak, known as Castle Craig, to resemble the towers built by the Turks along the Danube River in the 12th century.

Geography
Hubbard Park is nestled within the Hanging Hills, a dramatic trap rock mountain ridge overlooking the city of Meriden and the Quinnipiac River Valley 900 feet (274 m) below. Considered particularly scenic are Merimere Reservoir (punctuated with Mine Island) and Mirror Lake, nestled between South Mountain and East Peak. Portions of the park extend into neighboring Berlin and Southington.

Recreation
Hubbard Park is a popular outdoor recreation destination. The park is crossed by a number of hiking trails, most notably the  blue-blazed Metacomet Trail (maintained by the Connecticut Forest and Park Association), which traverses East Peak and West peak the park. Trails are open to hiking, backcountry skiing; roads are open to bicycling and mountain biking. Swimming and rock climbing are prohibited. From the top of Castle Craig it is possible to see most of the Quinnipiac Valley region, Long Island Sound, and the distant higher peaks of southern New England. East Peak is often cited as the highest mountain within  of the coastline from Cadillac Mountain in Maine to Florida, however, nearby West Peak is higher.

The park also features a bandshell and flower gardens and is the site of a variety of local festivals and concerts, most notably the spring Daffodil Festival. Castle Craig is open to the public in season. A park road (open from May 1st through October 31st from 10:00 a.m. to 5:30 p.m.) traverses the park.

The Daffodil Festival began in 1978 as a way for the community to come together in the springtime. Held every last weekend in April, the festival is celebrated with food, a parade, fireworks, and of course daffodils. The park is filled with these yellow flowers as the number continues to rise. Hubbard Park is transformed with a craft area with booths from different artists, food tent with live music, and games and rides. Shuttle busses are available throughout Meriden including Platt High School, Wilcox Technical School, the Westfield Mall, and downtown Meriden HUB. The Daffodil Festival is free admission for all.

The Festival of Silver Lights is a special celebration with seasonal lights that are displayed throughout the park in the winter months. There are over 300 lighted displays throughout the park and over half a million lights are used. The lights include many forest animals, alligators, camels, the globe, a Christmas tree, and hanging snowflakes. Cars can travel through the park and be mesmerized by the beauty of the night and lights.

Geology 
The Hanging Hills of Meriden are part of the Metacomet Ridge, which is nearly continuous from Belchertown, Massachusetts to Branford, Connecticut. The hanging Hills were formed by volcanic activity 200 million years ago during the rifting apart of North America from Eurasia.  Two major lava flows covered the red sandstone valley in Meriden.  Each cooled and hardened into trap rock (also known as basalt) and was gradually covered by sand and mud which eroded from the surrounding hills. Once the volcanic activity stopped, the whole region fractured and tilted to the west. Since then, hundreds of feet of the softer sandstone bedrock have eroded from the valley, leaving the dense, hard volcanic trap rock ridge layers standing out far above the surrounding landscape.

See also

National Register of Historic Places listings in New Haven County, Connecticut
National Register of Historic Places listings in Hartford County, Connecticut
National Register of Historic Places listings in Southington, Connecticut

References

 Raymo, Chet and Maureen E. Written in Stone: A Geologic History of the Northeastern United States. Globe Pequot, Chester, Connecticut, 1989.
 Connecticut Walk Book: A Trail Guide to the Connecticut Outdoors. 17th Edition. The Connecticut Forest and Park Association. Rockfall, Connecticut. Undated.
 Connecticut Windows on the Natural World. cited Dec. 13, 2007.

External links
 
 Connecticut Forest and Park Association
 Meriden Land Trust
 The Traprock Wilderness Recovery Strategy
 The City of Meriden

Meriden, Connecticut
Parks in New Haven County, Connecticut
Hanging Hills
National Register of Historic Places in New Haven County, Connecticut
National Register of Historic Places in Hartford County, Connecticut
Parks on the National Register of Historic Places in Connecticut